Aynur Doğan  (born 1 March 1975) is a contemporary Kurdish singer and musician from Turkey.

Career 
Aynur Doğan was born in Çemişgezek, a small mountain town in Tunceli Province in Turkey and fled to İstanbul in 1992. She studied saz and türkü singing in an influential music school in Istanbul, the Arif Sağ Müsik. In 2004 she released the album Keçe Kurdan on Kalan Müzik label. Keçe Kurdan was banned in 2005 due to the fact that two words in the song, Keçe (Girl) and Ceng (battle), according to a court in Diyarbakır, would encourage women to leave their partners, go to the mountains and hence the words promote division. The following year the ban was lifted. In 2005 she had a small role as herself in the movie Gönul Yarası. In 2012, following repeated threats by right-wing and anti-Kurdish militants, she relocated to Amsterdam, Netherlands.     

Aynur is a vocal artist who specializes in infusing traditional Kurdish folk music with a contemporary sensibility influenced by Western music. Her stunning vocal style and success in the music world has allowed her to become a prominent representative of Kurdish people in Turkey and throughout the world. She has taken the wealth of Kurdish oral tradition to the international stage that many of them at least 300 years old. Aynur has collaborated with numerous musicians, including Yo-Yo Ma and the Silk Road Ensemble, Kayhan Kalhor, Javier Limón, Kinan Azmeh, Nederland Blazers Ensemble and NDR Bigband and many more. Meanwhile, she appeared in Fatih Akın's documentary film Crossing the Bridge: The Sound of Istanbul as a singer and was also part of the documentary film about Yo-Yo Ma and the Silk Road Ensemble named "The music of Strangers" directed by Morgan Neville in 2015.

Awards And Recognition 
In 2017, Aynur received the Master of Mediterranean Music Award in the category of “Mediterranean Women in Action” from the Berklee Mediterranean Music Institute. This award recognized Aynur's efforts to preserve and reinterpret Kurdish folk music, which has transformed her into an influential role model for other women artists on the Mediterranean music scene who are seeking to share their voices. In August 2021 she was granted the Womex award for her resilience to perform in an environment in which she both as a Kurd and an Alevi has often been discriminated.   

Whenever she takes a melody, she makes it her own, transforming it into something beautiful, and every note, every microtone, every word reaches depth and unparalleled beauty. She is a reason to love live music for centuries.”  –Javier Limon

AlbumsHêdur, 2020,
 Hawniyaz, Harmonia Mundi, 2016
 Hevra, Sony Music Classical, 2013, 
 Rewend, Sony Music, 2010
 Nûpel, Kalan Music, 2005 
 Keçe Kurdan, Kalan Music, 2004
 Seyir, 2002

Albums on which she has been featuredHawniyaz, (2016) Güldünya Şarkıları, (2008)
Zülfü Livaneli Bir Kuşaktan Bir Kuşağa, Dağlara Küstüm Ali (2016)	
Kardeş Türküler, Bahar (2005)
Mercan Dede, Nefes (Breath), (2006)	
Orient Expressions, Divan, (2004)
Nederland Blazer Ensemble, Turqoıse (2006)
Mor ve Ötesi, Mermiler (2012) 	
A. Rıza - Hüseyin Albayrak, Böyle Buyurdu Aşık (2013), Şah Hatayi Deyişleri (2005)	
Metin Kemal Kahraman, Ferfecir, (1999), Sürella, (2000)	
Lütfü Gültekin, Gül Türküleri (2003), Derman Bizdedir, (1999)
Grup Yorum, Yürüyüş, (2003)

 References 

External links
 Official website 
 "Blues From the Mountains" 
 "Kurdish voice in a new world," San Francisco Chronicle'', September 17, 2006
 "SONGLINES: AYNUR / SOLACE IN EXILE", September 4, 2020
 "AlMonitor: Aynur Dogan gets Americans to sing her tune", October 23, 2018
"World Music Central: Artist Profiles / Aynur", September 13, 2018 
"Qantara: Trost aus den Klängen der Heimat", November 17, 2020
"Kurdish singer Aynur Dogan performs next to Italian conductor Riccardo Muti" ,July 5, 2020
"Kurdish singer Aynur received the Master of Mediterranean Music Award 2017", March 8, 2017

1975 births
Living people
People from Çemişgezek
Turkish Kurdish people
Kurdish women singers
Kurdish-language singers
21st-century Turkish women singers